Ken Jordan (born Kenneth Ray Jordan) is a former linebacker in the National Football League. He played for the Green Bay Packers during the 1987 NFL season.

References

Players of American football from Birmingham, Alabama
Green Bay Packers players
American football linebackers
Tuskegee Golden Tigers football players
1964 births
Living people